The George W. Wentworth House is a large Queen Anne style home, that was built in 1887 in West Saint Paul in the U.S. state of Minnesota. Wentworth was an emigre from England who traded in horses; he was also involved in local politics, working to organize the city of South Saint Paul. In the late 1880s, a dispute arose between the farmers in the western portion of the city, whom Wentworth represented, and the people living around the stockyards in the eastern portion of the city. West Saint Paul disjoined from South Saint Paul in 1889 and Wentworth remained politically active in the new city. After his death in 1908, the house remained vacant for many years before being renovated by subsequent owners. The hard work of current owner Daniel W. Owned since 1987-current day.

References

Houses completed in 1887
Houses in Dakota County, Minnesota
Houses on the National Register of Historic Places in Minnesota
National Register of Historic Places in Dakota County, Minnesota
Queen Anne architecture in Minnesota